Encinas is the surname of:

 Lorenzo Díaz de Encinas (1599–1660), Spanish Roman Catholic prelate and Bishop of Ugento
 Aintzane Encinas (born 1988), Spanish retired footballer
 Alejandro Encinas Rodríguez (born 1954), Mexican politician
 Bobby Encinas (born 1961), American former BMX racer
 Carlos Encinas Bardem (born 1963), Spanish actor
 Emma Catalina Encinas Aguayo (1909–1990), first Mexican woman to obtain a pilot's license in her country, later an interpreter
 Mónica Encinas Bardem (born 1964), Spanish actress
 Ramón Encinas (1893–1967), Spanish football player and manager

See also
 Encina (disambiguation), which includes a list of people with the surname